General elections were held in Gibraltar on 23 September 1959. The Association for the Advancement of Civil Rights remained the largest party in the legislature, winning three of the seven elected seats.

Electoral system
The legislature was elected by single transferable vote.

Campaign
A total of 13 candidates contested the elections; four for the Association for the Advancement of Civil Rights, four representing the Transport and General Workers' Union and five independents.

Results

Elected members

References

Gibraltar
General
General elections in Gibraltar
Election and referendum articles with incomplete results
September 1959 events in Europe